Charaxes violetta, the violet-spotted emperor or violet-spotted charaxes, is a butterfly of the family Nymphalidae. It is found in southern Africa.

Species is double brooded from August to October and April to June.

Larvae feed on Blighia unijugata and Deinbollia species.

Full description

The wingspan is 65–70 mm for males and 75–85 mm for females. Both sexes above almost exactly like the corresponding sexes of cithaeron, but differing in the presence of a fine, nearly straight transverse line in the middle of the hindwing beneath, distally margined with white, in the male narrowly, in the female for a breadth of 2–3 mm. Delagoa Bay to Nyassaland and Mombasa.Larva green, sprinkled with minute yellowish dots; horns on the head bluish or violet; the dorsal spots grey or rust-coloured.

Walter Rothschild and Karl Jordan, 1900 Novitates Zoologicae volume 7:287-524.  page 372 for terms see volume 5:545-601 .

Subspecies
Listed alphabetically:
C. v. maritima van Someren, 1966 (coast of Kenya, Tanzania: north-east to the coast)
C. v. melloni Fox, 1963 (Mozambique, eastern Zimbabwe, Malawi, eastern Tanzania)
C. v. meru van Someren, 1966 (Kenya: north-eastern slopes of Mount Kenya and in the Njombeni Hills)
C. v. violetta Grose-Smith, 1885 (southern Mozambique, South Africa: KwaZulu-Natal)

Realm
Afrotropical realm

Taxonomy
Charaxes tiridates group.

The supposed clade members are:
Charaxes tiridates
Charaxes numenes - similar to next
Charaxes bipunctatus - similar to last
Charaxes violetta
Charaxes fuscus
Charaxes mixtus
Charaxes bubastis
Charaxes albimaculatus
Charaxes barnsi
Charaxes bohemani
Charaxes schoutedeni
Charaxes monteiri
Charaxes smaragdalis
Charaxes xiphares
Charaxes cithaeron
Charaxes nandina
Charaxes imperialis
Charaxes ameliae
Charaxes pythodoris
? Charaxes overlaeti
For a full list see Eric Vingerhoedt, 2013.

References

Seitz, A. Die Gross-Schmetterlinge der Erde 13: Die Afrikanischen Tagfalter. Plate XIII 31
Victor Gurney Logan Van Someren, 1966 Revisional notes on African Charaxes (Lepidoptera: Nymphalidae). Part III. Bulletin of the British Museum (Natural History) (Entomology)45-101.

External links
Images of C. v. violetta Royal Museum for Central Africa (Albertine Rift Project)
Images of C. v. maritima (Albertine Rift Project)
Images at Bold Charaxes violetta
Bold images C. v. maritima (verso)
Bold images C. v. melloni

violetta
Butterflies described in 1885
Taxa named by Henley Grose-Smith
Butterflies of Africa